K-70 was a "Project 651" diesel–electric submarine built for the Soviet Navy during the 1960s. Commissioned in 1965, the boat was armed with long-range cruise missiles to carry out its mission of destroying American aircraft carriers and bases. The missiles could be fitted with either conventional or nuclear warheads. K-70 was initially assigned to the Northern Fleet, but was transferred to the Pacific Fleet a few months later. The submarine was decommissioned in 1989 and subsequently scrapped.

Background and description
In the late 1950s, the Soviet Navy was tasked to neutralize American bases and aircraft carriers. It began construction of a large number of expensive nuclear-powered (s) to accomplish this, but could not build enough nuclear reactors to equip them in a timely manner. Even though the Juliett class was inferior to the Echos, it was ordered into production because it did not require resources needed for the nuclear boats.

The Juliett-class boats are a double-hulled design that displaces  on the surface and  submerged. Unlike the earliest submarines of the class, K-70s hull was covered with anechoic tiles. The prominent blast deflectors cut out of the outer hull behind the missile launchers make the submarines very noisy at high speed. Their crew numbered 78 men.

Propulsion and performance
The Juliett class is powered by a diesel-electric system that consists of two  1D43 diesel engines and a pair of  MG-141 electric motors for cruising on the surface. Two additional  electric motors are intended for slow speeds underwater and are powered by four banks of lead-acid battery cells that are recharged by a  1DL42 diesel generator. The boats are fitted with a retractable snorkel to allow the diesel engines to operate while underwater.

They could carry enough supplies for 90 days of operation.

Armament
To carry out the Julietts' mission of destroying American carrier battle groups and bases, they were fitted with two pairs of missile launchers, one each fore and aft of the sail. The launchers were used by the surface-launched SS-N-3 Shaddock family of long-range, turbojet-powered, cruise missiles. The P-5D version was codenamed SS-N-3c by NATO and was a dedicated land-attack missile that could be equipped with either a high-explosive or nuclear warhead; it was withdrawn from service in 1965–1966. The P-6 (SS-N-3a) variant was a radar-guided anti-ship missile that could also be fitted with high-explosive and nuclear warheads.
 
The more traditional armament of the Julietts consisted of six  torpedo tubes mounted in the bow and four  torpedo tubes in the stern. Due to space limitations, no reloads were provided for the bow tubes, but each stern tube had two reloads for a total of twelve.

Fire control and sensors

The submarines relied upon aircraft for their long-range anti-ship targeting which they received via the Uspekh-U datalink system. Their own Argument missile-guidance radar (NATO reporting name: Front Door) controlled the P-6 missiles until they were out of range via a datalink codenamed Front Piece. The missiles' onboard radar would detect the targets and transmit an image back to the submarine via video datalink so the crew could select which target to attack, after which the missile relied upon its own radar for terminal guidance. The Argument radar has a massive antenna that was stowed at the front of the sail and rotated 180° for use. The Front Piece antenna was mounted on top of the Argument antenna.

The boats are fitted with Artika-M (MG-200) and Herkules (MG-15) sonars, Feniks-M (MG-10) and MG-13 hydrophones and a Albatros RLK-50 search radar (NATO reporting name: Snoop Tray). They are also equipped with a Nakat-M Electronic warfare support measures system.

Construction and career 
K-70 was laid down at the Krasnoye Sormovo Factory No. 112 shipyard in Gorky on 25 August 1962. She was launched on 6 February 1964 and commissioned on 22 January 1965 into the Northern Fleet, but was transferred to the Pacific Fleet on 15 March. The details of K-70s career remain largely unknown, although the boats deployed there are known to have made patrols in the Indian Ocean. The submarine was decommissioned on 30 June 1989 and subsequently scrapped.

References

Bibliography
 

Juliett-class submarines
Ships built in the Soviet Union
1964 ships
Cold War submarines of the Soviet Union